Lachine (French: La Chine, China) may refer to:

 Lachine, Quebec, a borough of Montreal
 Lachine (electoral district), a federal electoral district from 1968 to 1988
 Lachine Rapids, Quebec
 Lachine Canal, Quebec
 The Fur Trade at Lachine National Historic Site
 Lachine station, train station on the Vaudreuil–Hudson line of the Réseau de transport métropolitain commuter train network
 Notre-Dame-de-Grâce—Lachine, a federal electoral district
 Lachine massacre, 1689 attack by Mohawk warriors on the French settlement of Lachine, Quebec
 HMCS Lachine, a 1941 Bangor-class minesweeper of the Royal Canadian Navy
 Lachine, Michigan